The following is a timeline of the history of the city of Cartagena de Indias, Colombia.

Prior to 19th century (Colonial era)

 1500 - Rodrigo de Bastidas approaches to Cartagena's bay, naming it Barú bay.
 1503 - The catholic queen Isabel issue a royal decree, naming the Barú bay as the Cartagena's bay, due to its similarity with Cartagena (España)
 1523 - Gonzalo Fernández de Oviedo y Valdés obtains permission to commerce in Cartagena's bay and near regions.
 1525 - Fernandez de Oviedo obtains the capitulation to conquer the actual terrains of Cartagena.
 1533 - Cartagena founded by Spaniard Pedro de Heredia. It becomes one of the "major naval and merchant marine bases of the Spanish empire."
 1534 - Catholic Diocese of Cartagena established.
 1536
 Castillo San Felipe de Barajas (fort) construction begins.
 Cartagena obtains the dominance of the Morrosquillo Gulf and the terrains of the Sinú indigenous people.
 1538 - The Spanish crown authorizes taxes to the Indigenous people.
 1539 - Indigenous population: 500 approx. Population has decreased due to diseases and confrontations with colonizers.
 1543 - Jean-François Roberval plunders the city.
 1544 - Town was captured and plundered by pirates.
 1550 - Heredia becomes governor of Cartagena.
 1552 - A big fire occurs.
 1559 - French Martin Cote assaults Cartagena.
 1561 - The Nuevo Muelle dock is built, made up of wood.
 1565 - 1.000 inhabitants.
 1568 - John Hawkins invades and assaults Cartagena for 8 days.
 1574
 Francis Drake assaults Cartagena and destroys 1/4 of the city.
 Rey Felipe II gives Cartagena the title of city.
 1575 - Cartagena is recognized with the "Noble and Loyal" city title, as Cartageneros were Pro-Spanish Crown.
 1578 - Convento de Santo Domingo construction begins.
 1579
 Cartagena attains Spanish colonial city status.
 San Juan de Dios Hospital builds its second floor.
 1580 - The Saint Augustine convent is founded.
 1582 - Canal del Dique built.
 1585 - Sir Francis Drake exacted a large ransom from the town.
 1586 - Battle of Cartagena de Indias (1586). Drake again occupies and destroys much of the city.
 1595 - By the visit of the military engineer Bautista Antonelli, Cartagena's cobbled streets are traced.
 1603 - The Espiritú Santo hospital is founded in Getsemaní.
 1610 - Rey Felipe III establishes the Tribunal de Penas del Santo Oficio de la Inquisición.
 1612 - Cartagena Cathedral built.
 1614
 The Tribunal de Penas del Santo Oficio de la Inquisición proceeds with the first "act of faith".
 Stonework starts at Baluarte de Santo Domingo for the construction of the wall.
 1620 - Getsemaní is completely edificated. Its cabidity under the construction of Cartagena's wall is debated.
 1625 - The Aduana building is concluded.
 1630 - Population: 6.000
 1635 - The famous Cartagena Wall is completed, making Cartagena a military hub.
 1636 - A group of Portuguese immigrants are submitted to an "act of faith", accused of practicing judaism.
1646 - Castle of San Luis de Bocachica (fort) construction begins.
 1651 - Yellow fever epidemic in Cartagena.
 1654 - Iglesia de San Pedro Claver built.
 1657 - El fuerte de San Felipe (fort) is built over the San Lázaro hill.
 1683 - Raid on Cartagena (1683).
 1684 - Population: 7.341
 1697 - May 6: Raid on Cartagena (1697).
 1708 - Wager's Action, a naval confrontation on 8 June 1708, between a British squadron under Charles Wager and the Spanish treasure fleet off the coast near Cartagena
 1709 - Population: 4.556
 1710 - The city is fully recovered from what the last raid destroyed.
 1717 - Cartagena becomes part of the Spanish colonial Viceroyalty of New Granada.
 1730 - The San Carlos Hospital and the Poors Hospital open.
 1732 - El templo Santo Toribio (temple) built.
 1735 - Franciscan Church of the Third Order built.
 1741 - Battle of Cartagena de Indias. Large attacking force led by Admiral Edward Vernon defeated at the Castillo San Felipe by an outnumbered defensive force led by Blas del Lezo.
 1757 - Governor of Cartagena dictates the closing of Bocagrande's channel, making a peninsula, now called Bocagrande.
 1767 - After the expulsion of the jesuits the San Juan de Dios hospital is relocated.
 1769 - El fuerte de San Felipe is reinforced and enlarged by Antonio de Árevalo, becoming the biggest fort in Cartagena.
 1770 - Palace of Inquisition built (approximate date).
 1777 - 13.700 inhabitants.
 1780 - El espigón de La Tenaza (shore end) built.
 1785 - Antonio de Árevalo builds nine installations for ill people in Caño del Oro, Tierrabomba island.
 1795 - Consulado (merchant guild) established.
 1796 - Military barracks (known as Bóvedas) aside of the wall, are finished.

19th century
 1809 - 17.600 inhabitants.
 1810 - May 22: A coup leads to the creation of a new governing council.
 1811 - November 11:  Cartagena's Cabildo declares absolute independence from Spain, creating the Free State of Cartagena.
 1811 - Cartagena becomes part of the newly formed United Provinces of New Granada.
 1815
 March: Simón Bolívar blocks Cartagena for two months and takes military weapons in order to recuperate sister city Santa Marta.
 August: Asedio de Cartagena occurs during the independence war of Colombia, losing 1/3 of the population.
 Population: 18.708
 1816
 Pablo Morillo returns to Cartagena, in the so-called "reconquest".
 The nine martyrs are written off by the court-martial, accusing them of betrayal to the Spanish crown.
 1821
 Royalists surrender Cartagena to Simón Bolivar's forces after a 21-month siege.
 Cartagena becomes capital of the Magdalena department.
 1824 - War of independence finishes.
 1827 - University of Cartagena established.
 1835 - 11.929 inhabitants, population decreased significantly since the independence.
 1843 - Bartolomé Calvo Library founded.
 1849
 Cholera plague hits Cartagena, 1/3 of the population decease.
 El Porvenir newspaper begins publication.
 1850 - La Republica newspaper begins publication.
 1857 - The province of Cartagena is designated the name of Bolívar department, in honor to Simón Bolívar.
 1870 - El camellón de los Mártires (median strip) built, making a social place for the Cartagenero.
 1885 - The ermitage of El cabrero is built by the 4 times president Rafael Nuñez for his wife.
 1888 - A republican-style clock tower, Torre del reloj (Cartagena) is built over the entrance of the wall.
 1889 - Public Library José Fernandez de Madrid opens.
 1891 - El Espinal, El Cabrero, Manga and Pie de La Popa, become townships.
 1892 - Dispute on the terrains of La Boquilla.
 1894
 Cartagena's railway inaugurated, connecting the capital of the Bolivar department to the Magdalena river.
 Muelle de la Machina (dock) inaugurated.
 1898
 After a big depression, economy recuperates. Volume of exportation: 34.653 tons.
 The railway pier was lengthened 120 ft.

20th century - Republican era

 1904 - Mercado de Getsemaní (public market building) inaugurated.
 1905
The wall gate "Paz y progreso" is opened while the controversial "murallicidio".
 Urbanization in the Manga island starts, it is held by Henrique Luis Román who also built the H.L Román bridge. Connecting Getsemaní and Manga.
 Population: 14,000. (official estimate).
 1907 - Bolivar bank building inaugurated.
 1909 - Industrial park "El limbo" operates.
 1911 -  and  opens.
 1912 - Demographic rate peaks to 3.2% until 1951. Important immigration to the city takes place.
 1915 - Chamber of Commerce of Cartagena founded, 150 companies registered.
 1918 - Population: 50.000
 1920
 "Compañia Colombiana de Navegación Aerea" (airline) builds an airport in the terrains of Bocagrande.
 Club Cartagena opens.
 1923 - An oil pipeline is built between "Las Infantas" camp in Santander and Cartagena's bay.
 1928
 Banco de la Republica [national bank) building inaugurated, designed by the recognized Belgian architect, Joseph Martens.
 The Spirit of Saint Louis lands in Cartagena's airport.
 1930
 SCADTA (airline) builds an airfield in the Manzanillo island.
The Andean corporation urbanizes Bocagrande's peninsula giving shelter and entertainment to its workers.
 1931
 Fire in "La Machina" port.
 US president Franklin D. Roosevelt visits Cartagena.
 1934
 Port of Cartagena inaugurated.
 September: Naval base "ARC Bolívar" is inaugurated in Bocagrande.
Miss Colombia beauty pageant begins.
 1938
 Population: 73,190.
 Water bombing from canal del Dique, and water purification in Piedra de Bolívar starts.
 1939 - Club de Pesca of Cartagena (fishing club of Cartagena) founded in the San Sebastián del Pastelillo Fort.
 1941 - the Caribe Hotel in business.
 1947
 LANSA (Colombia) (airline) builds two runways in the Crespo suburb. Called "Airport of Crespo".
 Estadio Once de Noviembre (stadium) opens.
 1948 - El Universal newspaper begins publication.
 1951
 Service of Cartagena's railroad is suspended due to navigability through Canal del Dique.
 Population: 128,877.
 1956 - Cartagena Refinery of oil commissioned.
 1958 - Estadio Jaime Morón León (stadium) opens.
 1959 - Cartagena's historic center is declared a national monument.
 1960 - Cartagena Film Festival begins.
 1961
 Comfenalco (Compensation fund of Cartagena) established.
 Navy cadet school Almirante Padilla moved to the Manzanillo island.
 1965 - Fire destroys the Mercado de Getsemaní (public market).
 1967 - Mamonal industrial complex consolidated.
 1968 - Santander Avenue inaugurated, an important avenue which rounds the Cartagena wall.
 1970 - Universidad Tecnologica de Bolivar first private university in the city, founded.
 1973 - Population: 292,512.
 1974
 Private-state enterprise Ecopetrol takes the administration of the Cartagena oil refinery.
 Statue of India Catalina erected in La Matuna.
 1977 - New public market Bazurto is built. The building is recognized as architectural heritage of Colombia.
 1978 - The semi destroyed Mercado de Getsemaní is finally demolished.
 1979 - Centro de conveciones Julio Cesar Turbay Ayala (convention center) starts its construction.
 1980
 Hilton Cartagena inaugurated, becoming the first Hilton Hotel in Colombia.
 La Vitrola restaurant in business.
 1982
 Caribbean Music Festival begins.
 Museo del Oro (Cartagena) (gold museum) inaugurated.
 1984
 Cartagena's colonial walled city and fortress designated an UNESCO World Heritage Site.
 Archivo Historico de Cartagena (historical registry of Cartagena) established.
 Romancing The Stone filmed in Cartagena's historic center.
 1985
 García Márquez's fictional Love in the Time of Cholera published.
 Population: 513,986.
 1986 - The airport of Crespo is renamed as Rafael Nuñez in tribute to the centenary of the constitution.
 1991 - Cartagena is declared touristic and cultural district of Colombia.
 1993 - Sociedad Portuaria de Cartagena acquires the administration of Cartagena's port.
 1996 - SACSA (airline) acquires the administration of the Rafael Núñez International Airport.
 1997 - Jorge Artel Library is opened, it serves to the southwestern districts, the poorest ones.
 1999 - The American Hispanic Culture Library opens.

21st century

 2003 - Transcaribe transit system construction begins.
 2005
 875.730 inhabitants according to national census.
 Torre de la Escollera construction begins.
 2006
 July: XX Central American and Caribbean games celebrated in Cartagena.
 Ecopetrol and Glencore establish the Sociedad Refinería de Cartagena SA (Cartagena's refinery society).
 2008
 Judith Pinedo Flórez becomes mayor.
 Caribe Plaza opens.
2012
 April: Summit of the Americas held in Cartagena.
  becomes mayor, succeeded by Carlos Otero Gerdts.
 Mall Plaza El Castillo opens.
 2013
 Marine outfall inaugurated.
  becomes mayor.
 2014
 Cartagena's population reaches 1 million inhabitants.
 Bocagrande Plaza opens.
 2015
August: Puerto Bahía specialized docks for hydrocarbons gas liquids movement inaugurated.
October: Modernization and ampliation of the Cartagena's refinery finishes.
November: Transcaribe BRT starts operating.
December: Sunken 18th century Spanish galleon San José rediscovered offshore.
December 10: Port of Buenavista, located in Mamonal industrial district, inaugurated.
 2016
 Bolívar Department, which's capital is Cartagena, was the department that grew economically the most in 2016 with 11,4%, much higher than the 2% national average.
February: The planified city, Serena Del Mar, starts its construction in the north of Cartagena.
February 27: Mamonal specialized docks for carbon movement, inaugurated.
April: Crespo's tunnel inaugurated.
July: First Neopanamax ship docks at Cartagena's harbor.
September: Peace accords between the Colombian Government and the FARC are signed in the Turbay Ayala convention center, assembling presidents from different countries, and big personalities such as Ban Ki Moon.
December: Estelar Hotel inaugurated in Bocagrande, becoming the tallest building in Cartagena with 202 m (662 ft).
 Population: 1,013,389.
 2017
 February: Children's Baseball stadium, Mono Judas Araújo, rebuilt.
 May: Colombia's General Attorney's Office suspended mayor Manolo Duque from his charge because of corruption investigations. Duque being found guilty and imprisoned later. Sergio Londoño Zurek would become Cartagena's in-charge mayor until atypical elections were held.
 October: 9 members of Cartagena's council are investigated and called to the courts in January 2018.
 2018
 5 km long Viaducto Cienaga de la Virgen (bridge) inaugurated. Reducing travel time from downtown to north Cartagena and Barranquilla.

See also
 History of Cartagena, Colombia
 
 List of Governors of the Province of Cartagena

Other cities in Colombia:
 Timeline of Bogotá
 Timeline of Cali
 Timeline of Ocaña, Colombia

References

This article incorporates information from the Spanish Wikipedia.

Bibliography

in English

in Spanish
 
 Eduardo Lemaitre. Breve historia de Cartagena (Cartagena, 1958). In Spanish.
 Eduardo Lemaitre. Historia general de Cartagena. Bogotá: Banco de la República, 1983. In Spanish.
 
 Atlas historico de Cartagena. http://www.banrepcultural.org/blaavirtual/revistas/credencial/noviembre2001/cartagena.htm
 Cartagena de Indias, visión panoramica. http://www.banrepcultural.org/revista-91
 Banco de la Republica, Cartagena. http://www.banrepcultural.org/cartagena/historia

External links

 Map of Cartagena, 1994
 Items related to Cartagena, Colombia, various dates (via Europeana)

 
Cartagena
Cartagena
Years in Colombia